François de Chancy (1600–1656) was a French singer lutenist and composer. He was a master of music for Cardinal Richelieu in 1631, master of chamber music (1635) and was chamber musician of the King's Chapel (1649). François de Chancy was highly regarded by Mersenne, who included Chancy pieces in his treatises. He died in Paris in his mid-fifties.

He participated and collaborated on vocal music of the following ballets de cour:
 Ballet de la prospérité des armes de France, 1641
 Ballet du dérèglement des passions, 1648
 Ballet des fêtes de Bacchus, 1651

Publications
He was noted in following publications:
 Tablature de mandore (pub. 1629) in Paris with Ballard
 12 lute pieces in Tablature de luth de différents auteurs sur des accords nouveaux, (pub. 1631)
 two books of Airs de cour à 4 parties (pub. 1635, 1644), the 1st and 2nd Livre d'Équivoques (pub. 1640, 1647) and 3rd, 4th and 5th Livre de chansons (pub. 1649, 1651, 1655).

The other airs and tablatures are included in books of Chansons pour danser et pour boire (Paris: Ballard, 1660) and of Mss. M. Mersenne, in L'Harmonie universelle, in two German books (tablature for lute and tablature for mandore).

Bibliography
 Marc Honegger (ed.): Dictionnaire de la musique (Paris: Bordas, 1986), p. 231.

1600 births
1656 deaths
17th-century classical composers
French Baroque composers
Composers for lute
French ballet composers
French lutenists
French male singers
French male classical composers
17th-century male musicians